The 1947–48 Irish Cup was the 68th edition of the premier knock-out cup competition in Northern Irish football. 

Linfield won the tournament for the 24th time, defeating Coleraine 3–0 in the final at Celtic Park after the first match ended in a draw.

Results

First round

|}

Quarter-finals

|}

Semi-finals

|}

Replay

|}

Final

References

External links
 Northern Ireland Cup Finals. Rec.Sport.Soccer Statistics Foundation (RSSSF)

Irish Cup seasons
1947–48 domestic association football cups
1947–48 in Northern Ireland association football